John C. Wilson (August 19, 1899 – October 29, 1961) was an American theatre director and producer.

Early life
Born in Trenton, New Jersey Wilson started out his working life as a stockbroker. He married Natalia Pavlovna Paley on September 8, 1937 in Fairfield, Connecticut.  It was a marriage of convenience. Wilson was intelligent, rich and a good companion. Natalia's name and social skills were assets to his business as a Broadway producer. Princess Paley liked her husband's humor, and his homosexuality suited her distaste for physical love. They had no children.

Career
During the run of The Vortex by Noël Coward in 1924, Wilson met Coward and soon became his business manager and lover.  Wilson used his position to steal from Coward, but the playwright was in love and accepted both the larceny and Wilson's heavy drinking. 

Wilson began his theatre career in 1931 as General Manager for the original Broadway production of Coward's hit play Private Lives.  He began producing shows on Broadway in 1935, including Coward's Tonight at 8.30 in 1936 and Set to Music in 1939.  Wilson's first project as a director was another Coward work, Blithe Spirit, in 1941.

Additional credits
1952: The Deep Blue Sea (Producer)
1951: Make a Wish (Director)
1950: The Lady's Not for Burning (Producer) 
1949: Gentlemen Prefer Blondes (Director)
1948: Kiss Me, Kate (Director)
1947: The Winslow Boy (Producer)
1946: Present Laughter (Producer and Director)
1945: The Day Before Spring (Producer and Director)
1944: Bloomer Girl (Producer)
1942: The Pirate by S. N. Behrman (Director)

References

External links
 
John C. Wilson Papers. Yale Collection of American Literature, Beinecke Rare Book and Manuscript Library.

1899 births
1961 deaths
American theatre directors
American theatre managers and producers
People from Lawrence Township, Mercer County, New Jersey
LGBT theatre directors
LGBT theatre managers and producers
Stockbrokers
American gay men